John Bernard "Jack" Mackey, VC (16 May 1922 – 12 May 1945) was an Australian recipient of the Victoria Cross, the highest award for gallantry in the face of the enemy that can be awarded to British Commonwealth forces. Mackey was one of twenty Australians to receive the award for actions during the Second World War, receiving his award posthumously for leading an attack on against a strongly defended Japanese position during the Battle of Tarakan in May 1945. He was 22 and serving as a corporal in the 2/3rd Pioneer Battalion at the time of his death.

Early life
Born in Leichhardt, New South Wales, Mackey was the only son and the eldest of four children of Stanislaus Mackey, a baker, and his wife Bridget Catherine Smyth Mackey. After attending St. Columba's School in Leichhardt and the Christian Brothers' High School in Lewisham, New South Wales, the Mackey family moved to Portland, New South Wales, in 1936, where his father operated a bakery. Mackey finished his schooling at the age of 14 and began working for his father as a baker. However, he did not enjoy the work and his relationship with his father deteriorated.

Second World War
On 5 June 1940, Mackey enlisted in the Second Australian Imperial Force, falsifying his age to do so. After training, he was posted to the 2/3rd Pioneer Battalion and left with the unit in November 1941 for service in North Africa. He participated in the Syrian Campaign against the Vichy French and in the Second Battle of El Alamein.

The Japanese threat to Australia grew as they advanced through the Pacific in 1942. In response, the Australian government requested the withdrawal of Australian units back to their home country, and Mackey's battalion returned in February 1943. It served in Papua New Guinea from August 1943 to March 1944, during which time Mackey was promoted to the rank of corporal. While in Papua, he suffered several bouts of malaria. After a period of rest and reorganisation in Australia, the battalion returned to the Southwest Pacific theatre of operations in April 1945 when they were committed to the Borneo Campaign.

On 1 May 1945, Mackey's battalion, as part of 26th Brigade Group, landed at Lingkas Beach on Tarakan Island, off North Borneo. The island's airfield was to be captured to allow its use in operations against Borneo. Advancing inland along the Aman River, the battalion were held up by Japanese defending a stronghold known as Helen. On 12 May 1945, Mackey's company was to continue an attack that had begun three days previously and it was during this action that he earned the Victoria Cross (VC).  The citation for his VC read:

The Japanese continued to hold off the attacking pioneers for a further two days before Helen was bombed with napalm, forcing them to abandon the position. Originally buried where he was killed, after the war Mackey was interred at Labuan War Cemetery. Mackey's VC was presented to his sister, Patricia, and was later donated to the Australian War Memorial, where it is now on display in the Hall of Valour.

Notes

References

External links
John Mackey at the Australian War Memorial

1922 births
1945 deaths
Military personnel from New South Wales
Australian Army soldiers
Australian military personnel killed in World War II
Australian World War II recipients of the Victoria Cross
Australian people of Irish descent
People from Sydney
Australian Army personnel of World War II
Burials at Labuan War Cemetery
Australian bakers